The Penta case (or Penta-SQM, since the two cases are related) is a criminal case brought against Grupo Penta (or Empresas Penta), a Chilean holding company, and employees of the Chilean National Tax System (SII).  Key employees of the firm have been convicted of committing tax fraud by creating fake invoices in the National Tax System (SII). These funds were then directed to the political campaigns of mainly UDI (far right wing) politicians as campaign contributions. Several Penta employees, as some of their family members, have been convicted of tax evasion, bribery, and money laundering. Both directors of Penta Bank, Carlos Alberto Délano and Carlos Eugenio Lavín, were penalized with paying a fine, spending a few days in a special prison for economic crimes, and attending mandatory ethics classes.

Update 2 December 2015:  The former president of the UDI political party Jovino Novoa is sentenced to 3 years parole (pena remitida) for tax crimes.

Here are the defendants from Penta:

Here are the defendants from the SII:

Here are some of the politicians to whom Penta funneled funds.

Others charged:

References

Legal history of Chile
Corruption in Chile